Kelvin Boakye Yiadom (born 8 September 2000) is a Ghanaian footballer who currently plays as a midfielder for Ghana Premier League side WAFA.

Career 
Yiadom was born in Kumasi. He began playing football for juvenile side Stamford Heroes in Afrancho, Kumasi at the age of 8. Whilst playing there he was scouted by Prince Owusu. He started his professional career with West African Football Academy and was promoted to the senior team in August 2017. He was named on the bench for 6 matches during the 2017 season, but did not make any league appearance. He made his debut during the 2018 season on 22 April 2018, after coming on in the 47th minute for Jamal Haruna  in a 3–2 victory over Cape Coast Ebusua Dwarfs. Yiadom made another appearance in a match against Dreams FC which ended in a 5–0 victory for WAFA, before the league was cancelled due to controversies relating to the GFA.

During the Normalisation Committee Special Competition, he made only an appearance. However, in their 2019–20 campaign, he played a more important role by playing 11 league matches and scoring 2 goals, scoring his debut goal and second by scoring a brace in a massive 6–1 home victory over Ashanti Gold.

References

External links 

 
 

Living people
2000 births
Association football midfielders
Ghanaian footballers
Ghana Premier League players
People from Kumasi